Bèna is a town in the Solenzo Department of Banwa Province in western Burkina Faso.  it had a population of 11,963.

References

Populated places in the Boucle du Mouhoun Region
Banwa Province